The 2011–12 ISAF Sailing World Cup was a series of sailing regattas staged during 2011–12 season. The series featured boats which feature at the Olympics and Paralympics.

Regattas

Results

2.4 Metre

Men's 470

Women's 470

49er

Women's Elliott 6m

Men's Finn

Men's Laser

Women's Laser Radial

Men's RS:X

Women's RS:X

SKUD 18

Sonar

Men's Star

References

External links
 Official website

2011-12
2011 in sailing
2012 in sailing